Andrea Guerra may refer to:

 Andrea Guerra (footballer) (born 1972), former Italian footballer
 Andrea Guerra (composer), Italian film score composer
 Andrea Guerra (businessman) (born 1965), Italian business manager